2013–2014 Atlantic winter storms in Europe were a series of winter storms affecting areas of Atlantic Europe and beyond. The French Atlantic coastal regions (chiefly Brittany), South West and Southern England, West Wales, Ireland, Spanish Atlantic coastal regions (particularly Galicia) were especially affected by a "conveyor belt" series of high-precipitation storms (mostly not exceptional for their winds) and by high tides. Many storms were explosively deepened by a strong jet stream, many deepening below 950 hPa. The repeated formation of large deep lows over the Atlantic brought storm surges and large waves which coincided with some of the highest astronomical tides of the year and caused coastal damage. The low pressure areas brought heavy rainfalls which led to flooding, which became most severe over parts of England such as at the Somerset Levels. The repeated storms fit into a pattern of disturbed weather in the Northern Hemisphere, which saw from November 2013 a disturbance to the jet stream in the western Pacific, which propagated eastwards bringing a warm winter to Alaska, drought to California, and repeated cold air outbreaks to the eastern USA where the early 2014 North American cold wave resulted.

Autumn 2013
The end of October brought the St. Jude storm, ranked within the top 10 most severe storms in the autumn across southern England in the last 40 years. following the St. Jude storm a series of low pressure systems swept across western Europe bringing winds and rain, though not developing anywhere near as deeply as the St. Jude storm. A low named Godehard was the strongest of these low pressure areas and brought some disruption to Wales, with a gust of  recorded at Mumbles. Storm-force winds left 10,000 homes without electricity in Wales on the first weekend of November 2013. On 2 November the M4 Motorway was closed between Margam and Pyle due to the weather, and a roof canopy at the Princess of Wales Hospital Bridgend was damaged. The old Severn Bridge on the M48 motorway was closed, with speed restrictions in place on the Second Severn Crossing. The M4 at Briton Ferry – where the motorway crosses the Neath – also saw speed restrictions and the Britannia Bridge to Anglesey and the Cleddau Bridge in Pembrokeshire also saw speed restrictions enacted. Natural Resources Wales warned of localised flooding with sea spray and overtopping of sea defences along the Pembrokeshire, Ceredigion and Newport coasts. The low pressure also brought large waves to Aberystwyth which caused some disruption to seafront properties.

November/December 2013

Late November and early December saw an area of high pressure positioned to the west of Britain and Ireland, this directed the westerly path of weather systems moving over the Atlantic to the north of the UK, along which the storms developed before impacting across the Nordic countries. Lows moving to the north of the United Kingdom meant that November was fairly dry for the country. December saw long periods of calm conditions in France also with dry and sunny weather predominating. A change in the weather regime began as active depressions brought strong rain and snowfall to the mountains towards the month end. Until 13 December, France (and UK and Ireland) were protected by a powerful anticyclone stretched from the Maghreb to the British Isles, which deflected the Atlantic storm track north into Scandinavia. The Nordic nations were affected by a series of storms, including Hilde (17 November), Oskari (1 dec), Xaver (5–7 Dec), Ivar (12 Dec) and Zaki and Adam (14–15 Dec). Cyclone Xaver is predominantly known for the North sea storm surge of 5 December in the UK. The high pressure over Britain, Ireland and the Atlantic moved east during mid December, opening the way for areas of low pressure to reach western Europe. During mid-December a strong temperature gradient established over eastern North America (temperatures in New York , Montreal ), which enhanced the jetstream in the North Atlantic. The lows moved under this powerful jet stream where they explosively deepened before reaching Western Europe.

Christmas and New Year storms

Bernd (18–19 December)

The first storm of this period was named Bernd, it was also given the name Emily after Emily Brontë the author, who died on 19 December 165 years ago, and who wrote Wuthering Heights which featured constant stormy weather by some press. Met Éireann issued red warnings for wind at 9:00am 18 December to Donegal, Galway, Leitrim, Mayo and Sligo. The UK Met Office issued orange warnings for the Highlands, Western Isles, Strathclyde and Northern Ireland.

Dirk (23–24 December)

Dirk formed over North America, some storminess was associated with the low in Canada, before it moved into the Atlantic. The preceding weather in North America saw a steep temperature gradient (temperatures in New York , Montreal ) which enhanced the jetstream in the North Atlantic. The low moved under this powerful jet stream where it explosively deepened before reaching Western Europe.

Deepening below  is considered uncommon in the North Atlantic, but has been recorded on a number of occasions, measured from ships transiting the ocean and from land based-recording stations.

At the southernmost tip of the Faroe Islands a low air pressure of 932.2 hPa was recorded on Christmas Eve at Akraberg lighthouse.

Erich (26–27 December)

Felix & Gerhard

A stormy period between Christmas and New Year followed as Weather fronts associated with the lows Felix (30 December) and Gerhard (1 January) passed over the UK which brought further rainfall and some stormy conditions.

At Croyde Bay in north Devon a woman was rescued from sea who later died on 31 December.

27-year-old man swept out to sea on Loe Bar Porthleven Cornwall New Year's Eve, and on 1 January a man was found dead on the banks of River Torridge in Bideford, Devon. Over the holiday period, several New Year outdoor swimming events were cancelled.

Notes
Naming conventions (where possible) follow those adopted by the Free University of Berlin's  adopt a vortex scheme. Names from other sources referenced in article.

References

External links
House of Commons Environment, Food and Rural Affairs Committee Winter floods 2013–14
Met Office and Centre for Ecology and Hydrology: The Recent Storms and Floods in the UK, 9 February 2014.
Met Office: Marine weather analysis - December 2013 & January 2014
Environment Agency report
Met Eireann: What’s up with the Weather this winter? Aidan Murphy 14 February 2014.
Met Eireann: Winter 2013/2014, 3 March 2014
Environment Agency Flickr Galleries:
St Jude's day storm
December 2013 East Coast Surge
Tidal Surge recovery December 2013
December 2013 flooding
January 2014 flooding
February 2014 flooding

2013-2014
2013 meteorology
2014 meteorology
2013 in Europe
2014 in Europe